Pedra Branca is a rock islet in the Southern Ocean, off the southern coast of Tasmania, Australia. The island is estimated to have separated from the Tasmanian mainland at least 15,000 years ago.

Features and location
Pedra Branca experiences wet and windy weather, and large waves. The geology features three breccia cones of dolerite and sandstone.

Flora and fauna
The only plant species found on the island is the succulent Sarcocornia quinqueflora.  Recorded breeding seabird species include fairy prion, Pacific gull, silver gull, kelp gull, black-faced cormorant, Australasian gannet, and shy albatross. Australian fur seals use the island as a regular haul-out site while New Zealand fur seals visit occasionally.

The island is the only known habitat of a species of lizard, the Pedra Branca skink, Niveoscincus palfreymani. An estimated 400 individuals survive, but the species is listed as vulnerable.

Important Bird Area
Together with the nearby Eddystone and Sidmouth Rock the island constitutes the  Pedra Branca Important Bird Area (IBA), identified as such by BirdLife International because it supports over 1% of the world populations of shy albatrosses and Australasian gannets.

History
Abel Tasman led the first known European expedition to sight Tasmania. His journal entry for 29 November 1642 records that he observed a rock which was similar to a rock named Pedra Branca off China, presumably referring to the Pedra Branca in the South China Sea.

Pedra Branca means "white rock" in Portuguese.

Shipwreck

On 7 February 1973 Nisshin Maru No. 8, a Japanese steel fishing vessel of  led by Captain Nakayama, on its way to Hobart for a mechanical inspection, hit Pedra Branca and sank in deep water within a few minutes.  In the ensuing confusion only one of the crew of 22, engineer Yoshiichi Meguro, managed to clamber onto the rocks and escape drowning. The fishing vessel Walrus rescued the survivor.

The Nisshin Maru No. 8 disaster led to considerable improvements in communications between the various authorities that should have been able to mount a rescue operation many hours before this one was commenced. These included direct links between Japanese fishing boats and Australian shore stations, and correcting the inability of fishing vessels to directly contact warships and military aircraft, as they were unable to contact the Hobart emergency radio station which did not operate at night.

Weather
Weather conditions in the area can be extreme, and Pedra Branca is occasionally swept by freak waves. On 15 April 2003, oceanographer Hamish Saunders drowned after being washed off Pedra Branca. The Tasmanian coroner's report includes testimony from three witnesses who described how Saunders was swept away when a "wave hit the island resulting in heavy spray coming up to and over the  level".

Etymology
Pedra Branca is Portuguese for "white rock".  According to historian Kenneth McIntyre, Pedra Branca is one of only two Australian places with a name of Portuguese origin, the other being the Houtman Abrolhos islands in Western Australia.

Surfing
Marti Paradisis was the first person to surf it. later, In 2008 Ross Clarke-Jones and Tom Carroll joined local surfer Marti Paradisis and brothers James and Tyler Hollmer-Cross to shoot a story about it which was featured on 60 Minutes.

See also

 List of islands of Tasmania

References

Protected areas of Tasmania
Southern Tasmania
Important Bird Areas of Tasmania
Islands of South West Tasmania
Maritime history of the Dutch East India Company
Surfing locations in Tasmania